Tompkins Branch is a  long 1st order tributary to the Pudding Creek in Pittsylvania County, Virginia. This is the only stream of this name in the United States.

Course 
Tompkins Branch rises in a pond about 2 miles northeast of Woods Store, Virginia, and then flows generally east to join Pudding Creek about 0.5 miles northwest of Hopewell.

Watershed 
Tompkins Branch drains  of area, receives about 45.9 in/year of precipitation, has a wetness index of 446.94, and is about 40% forested.

See also 
 List of Virginia Rivers

References 

Rivers of Virginia
Rivers of Pittsylvania County, Virginia
Tributaries of the Roanoke River